Jan Andersson (born 7 May 1955) is a former speedway rider from Sweden.

Speedway career 
Jan Andersson was a leading speedway rider during the 1980s reaching six Speedway World Championship finals in 1978, 1980, 1981, 1982, 1984 and 1985. He was the Swedish champion on four occasions (1979, 1980, 1981 and 1984) and Nordic Champion in 1979.

He rode in the top tier of British Speedway riding for the Swindon Robins and Reading Racers from 1975 until 1992. He is regarded as a club legend at Reading.

World final appearances

Individual World Championship
 1978 -  London, Wembley Stadium - 14th - 3pts
 1980 -  Gothenburg, Ullevi - 4th - 11pts
 1981 -  London, Wembley Stadium - 6th - 9pts
 1982 -  Los Angeles, Memorial Coliseum - 8th - 8pts
 1984 -  Gothenburg, Ullevi - 10th - 6pts
 1985 -  Bradford, Odsal Stadium - 10th - 7pts

World Team Cup
 1985 -  Long Beach, Veterans Memorial Stadium (with Jimmy Nilsen / Per Jonsson / Tommy Nilsson / Pierre Brannefors) - 4th - 10pts (5)
 1986 -  Göteborg, Ullevi,  Vojens, Speedway Center and  Bradford, Odsal Stadium (with Jimmy Nilsen / Per Jonsson / Tommy Nilsson / Erik Stenlund / Tony Olsson) - 4th - 73pts (28)

World Pairs Championship
 1978 -  Chorzów, Silesian Stadium (with Börje Klingberg) - 7th - 11pts (10)
 1980 -  Krsko, Matija Gubec Stadium (with Richard Hellsen) - 4th - 18pts (9)
 1983 -  Göteborg, Ullevi (with Pierre Brannefors) - 5th - 16pts (12)
 1985 -  Rybnik, Rybnik Municipal Stadium (with Per Jonsson) - 5th - 14pts (10)
 1986 -  Pocking, Rottalstadion (with Tommy Nilsson) - 4th - 32pt (17)

References 

1955 births
Living people
Swedish speedway riders
Reading Racers riders
Swindon Robins riders